William Hatfield (1892–1969) was the pen name of Ernest Chapman, an English-born writer best known for his work in Australia.

Biography
He emigrated to Australia in 1912 and did a variety of jobs before turning to writing with Sheepmates in 1931. He wrote fiction for adults and children, travel stories, autobiography, short stories (particularly for The Australian Journal and Australiana). Hatfield served in the Australian army during World War II.

He was, in September 1949, a charter member of the Australian Peace Council.

Hatfield died on 2 February 1969 at Concord, New South Wales.

Film work
Sheepmates was meant to be filmed in 1934 by F. W. Thring, and Hatfield helped scout locations, but the project was abandoned during shooting. Hatfield promised Thring to shoot some footage of an aboriginal corroboree for a proposed screen version of Collits' Inn during a cross-country trip, but the film did not eventuate. Thring also bought the rights to Ginger Murdoch as a vehicle for George Wallace but died before he got a chance to make it.

Cinesound Productions announced a film version of Hatfield's novel Big Timber but instead chose to shoot an original script, Tall Timbers (1937).

Selected writings
Sheepmates (1931)
Ginger Murdoch (1932)
Christmastown (1932)
Desert Saga (1933)
River Crossing (1934)
Black Waterlily (1935)
Australia Through the Windscreen (1936)
Big Timber (1936)
I Find Australia (1937)
Buffalo Jim (1938)
Barrier Reef Days (1948)
Wild Dog Frontier (1951)

References

External links
William Hatfield at Australian Dictionary of Biography
William Hatfield at AustLit (subscription required)
Big Timber was serialised in 1936 – Feb 25, Feb 26, Feb 27, Feb 28, Mar 2, Mar 3, Mar 4, Mar 5, Mar 6, Mar 7, Mar 9, Mar 11, Mar 12, Mar 13, Mar 14, Mar 16, Mar 17,Mar 19, Mar 20, Mar 21, Mar 23,Mar 24, Mar 25, Mar 26, Mar 27, Mar 28, Mar 30, Mar 31, Apr 1, Apr 2, Apr 3,Apr 4, Apr 6, Apr 7,Apr 8, Apr 9, Apr 10 – final

Australian writers
1892 births
1969 deaths
English emigrants to Australia
Australian pacifists